William Wyllie may refer to:

 William Morrison Wyllie (–1895), an English painter of coastal and maritime themes
 William Lionel Wyllie (1851–1931), son of William Morrison Wyllie, a prolific English painter of maritime themes
 William Wyllie (British Army officer) (1802–1891), Indian army officer
 William Hutt Curzon Wyllie (1848–1909), Indian army officer, later an official of the British Indian Government

See also 

 William Wiley (disambiguation)